The 1964 Magyar Kupa (English: Hungarian Cup) was the 25th season of Hungary's annual knock-out cup football competition.

Final

See also
 1964 Nemzeti Bajnokság I

References

External links
 Official site 
 soccerway.com

1964–65 in Hungarian football
1964–65 domestic association football cups
1964